Nothing but a Good Time! Unauthorized is a documentary film centered around U.S. hard rock/glam metal band Poison that was released in 2003 following the distribution of the band's studio album Hollyweird. Taking its title from the 1988 Poison single "Nothin' But a Good Time", it features interviews with related musicians such as Bret Michaels and C.C. DeVille

Despite the subject material covered, the movie includes neither live performances from the band nor any musical pieces from their studio releases. It was developed without the creative control of Poison members.

Alternate versions
Rock Legends is the import version, the same DVD with a different cover and title.

In 2006 the DVD was re-released under the title Stand on the Road with a new cover (a Crack a Smile album photo, despite no material from Crack a Smile featuring on the video), and Poison music videos were included this time.

In 2009 the DVD was re-released yet again under a new cover and title: Poison: Rock Power.

Track listing
 Every Rose Has Its Thorn
 Unskinny Bop
 I Won't Forget You
 Stand
 Your Mama Don't Dance
 Ride the Wind - start + end credits

Band members
 Bret Michaels - lead vocals
 Bobby Dall - bass guitar
 Rikki Rockett - drums
 C.C. DeVille - lead guitar
 Richie Kotzen - lead guitar (Video 4)

References

External links
Poison - Official Website

2003 video albums
Poison (American band) video albums